Jeremy Hartnett is an American classicist and scholar of the archaeology and social life of Ancient Rome and Herculaneum. He is the Anne and Andrew T. Ford Professor of the Liberal Arts at Wabash College, and specializes in the urban history and street life of the ancient world. In 2018, he won the American Historical Association's James Henry Breasted Prize for his book The Roman Street: Urban Life and Society in Pompeii, Herculaneum, and Rome.

References

Wabash College faculty
Classical archaeologists
21st-century American archaeologists
Living people
Year of birth missing (living people)